The 1900 All-Ireland Senior Football Championship was the 14th staging of Ireland's premier Gaelic football knock-out competition. The Leinster Quarter Final Wexford end Dublin's 3 year All Ireland title. Tipperary were the winners.

Format
1900 saw the introduction of a new All-Ireland format. The four provincial championships would be played as usual. The four champions play in the "Home" championship, with the winners of the Home final going on to face London in the All-Ireland final.

Results

Connacht Senior Football Championship
Galway were the only entrants, so they received a bye to the Home semi-final.

Leinster Senior Football Championship

Munster Senior Football Championship

Ulster Senior Football Championship
Antrim were the only entrants, so they received a bye to the Home semi-final.

All-Ireland Senior Football Championship

Tipperary made an objection and were awarded the game.

Championship statistics

Miscellaneous
 Connacht and Munster back for the first time since 1892.
 London become part of the All Ireland Series.
 Tipperary won the double in football and hurling for the like 5 years before hand in 1895 the last time that it happened until Cork in 1990.

References